Geissomeria ciliata is a plant native to the Cerrado vegetation of Brazil. This plant grows in Uberlândia city, state of Minas Gerais.

External links
 Geissomeria ciliata in Uberlândia city, state of Minas Gerais.

ciliata
Flora of Brazil
Flora of the Cerrado